"Aba Daba Honeymoon" is a popular song written and published by Arthur Fields and Walter Donovan in 1914, known through its chorus, "Aba daba daba daba daba daba dab, Said the chimpie to the monk; Baba daba daba daba daba daba dab, Said the monkey to the chimp," and first recorded in 1914 by the comic duo team of Collins & Harlan.

Debbie Reynolds and Carleton Carpenter version

A version of the song "Aba Daba Honeymoon" was featured in the 1950 film, Two Weeks with Love. The single released from that film was recorded by Debbie Reynolds and Carleton Carpenter on August 4, 1950, and issued as a single by MGM Records as catalog number 30282. It reached number 3 on the Billboard charts in 1951.

M-G-M sent the pair on a multicity personal appearance tour of Loews theaters to capitalize on its success, beginning in Washington, D.C.

Other versions
Richard Hayes and Kitty Kallen recorded the song for Mercury Records in 1951. It peaked at number 9 on the Billboard magazine chart.
The Freddy Martin Ork with Merv Griffin also succeeded with the song on RCA Victor Records, as well as Hoagy Carmichael and Cass Daley on Decca.
"Aba Daba Honeymoon" was featured on the 1959 soundtrack to Have Rocket, Will Travel, the first feature film to star the Three Stooges after their 1959 resurgence in popularity.

References

Debbie Reynolds songs
1914 songs
MGM Records singles
Novelty songs
Songs with lyrics by Arthur Fields
Songs about primates